Liautaud Ethéart (1826–1888) was a Haitian playwright and politician. Born in Port-au-Prince, Ethéart served as Secretary of State in 1879. He was Minister of Finance 1872-1873 and 1876-1877. He is best remembered for his theatrical works.

Selected works 

 Le Monde de Chez Nous (1857)
 Miscellanées (1858)
 La Fille de l'Empereur (1860)
 Un Duel sous Blanchelande (1860)

References

 

1826 births
1888 deaths
Haitian male dramatists and playwrights
People from Port-au-Prince
Foreign Ministers of Haiti
Finance ministers of Haiti
Government ministers of Haiti
19th-century Haitian dramatists and playwrights
19th-century male writers